An instrument of surrender is a surrendering document of a military conflict, as those documents are legal instruments. Some such documents are:

World War II
Japanese Instrument of Surrender
German Instrument of Surrender
Armistice between Italy and Allied armed forces

Other conflicts
Argentine surrender in the Falklands War 1982
Pakistani Instrument of Surrender (1971) at the end of the Bangladesh Liberation War